Shadabad-e Olya (also Romanized as Shādābād-e ‘Olyā) is a village in Shirez Rural District, Bisotun District, Harsin County, Kermanshah Province, Iran. At the 2006 census, its population was 289, in 67 families.

References 

Populated places in Harsin County